Capurso is an Italian surname. Notable people with the surname include:

Marta Capurso (born 1980), Italian short track speed skater
Susanna Capurso (born 1958), Italian actress

Italian-language surnames